Fallen Hero is a British television series which aired on ITV in two series between 1978 and 1979. It portrays a rugby league star forced to retire from the game after an injury, and the struggles of he and his wife to adjust to their new circumstances.

Actors who appeared in episodes of the series include Pauline Delaney, Tessa Peake-Jones, Fiona Mollison, Maggie Ollerenshaw, Timothy Carlton and Alan MacNaughtan.

Main cast
 Del Henney as  Gareth Hopkins
 Wanda Ventham as  Dorothy Hopkins 
 Barry Stanton as Joe Harris
 John Wheatley as  Martin Hopkins
 Frank Crompton as  Wilf Calder
 Marged Esli as Sally Jones 
 Nesta Harris as  Meg Hopkins
 Prunella Gee as  Rebecca Westgate
 Jonathan Barlow as Ken Hopkins
 Robert Swann as  Philip Birley

References

Bibliography
 Lewis, Justin. Benedict Cumberbatch - The Biography. Kings Road Publishing, 2015.
 Palmer, Scott. British Film Actors' Credits, 1895-1987. McFarland, 1988.

External links
 

1978 British television series debuts
1979 British television series endings
1970s British drama television series
English-language television shows
ITV television dramas
Television series by ITV Studios
Television shows produced by Granada Television
Rugby league television shows